William Haselden Ellerbe (April 7, 1862June 2, 1899) was the 86th governor of South Carolina from 1897 to 1899.

Born in Marion, South Carolina, he was raised in the Pee Dee region of South Carolina and attended Wofford College and Vanderbilt University. After which he returned to Marion to marry Henrietta Rogers and engage in planting and business ventures.

His political career began when he was elected as Comptroller of South Carolina in 1890, serving until 1894. In the 1896 gubernatorial election, he won the Democratic primary and convincingly won in the general election to become the 86th governor of South Carolina. He sought re-election two years later in the 1898 gubernatorial election and was unopposed in his bid. However, he died on June 2, 1899, before he was able to finish his second term as governor and was buried in Marion.

External links 
 
 SCIway Biography of William Haselden Ellerbe
 NGA Biography of William Haselden Ellerbe

1862 births
1899 deaths
Wofford College alumni
Vanderbilt University alumni
Democratic Party governors of South Carolina
University of South Carolina trustees
19th-century American politicians
People from Marion, South Carolina
19th-century American Episcopalians
19th-century American businesspeople
Ellerbe